Ayshah Tull is a British presenter and journalist at Channel 4 News. Formerly, she was at the BBC working mainly for the children's news programme, Newsround. Tull has also presented for BBC Sport along with having her reports appear on BBC Breakfast, World TV, and the Victoria Derbyshire programme.

Career
In 2010, she got a place on the BBC production Production Trainee Scheme. Out of 4,000 applicants, she was one of 12 selected for the scheme. She started her on-air career in 2013 after being talent scouted and had a screen-test. Before that, she worked as a producer on BBC Radio 5 Live (including BBC's coverage of the Olympics) and Sky News.

Background
Tull was born in London and attended the Ellen Wilkinson School for Girls in Acton. She has a degree in geography at King's College London London and a postgraduate certificate in broadcast journalism at City, University of London.

Recognition
She received the George Viner Memorial Fund grant administered by the National Union of Journalists in 2009. She has been shortlisted for a Diversity in Media Award in the journalist or Writer of the Year category in 2018. In 2019, Tull was named an ambassador for the charity Mencap, which supports people with learning disabilities.

References

External links
Profile  on Newsround

Year of birth missing (living people)
Living people
BBC television presenters
Alumni of King's College London
BBC radio producers
21st-century British journalists
British women journalists
Journalists from London
Women radio producers